Lun Bawang or  is the language spoken by the Lun Bawangs. It belongs to the Malayo-Polynesian family. 

 is an alternate name in East Kalimantan.

History
Lun Bawang is mainly an oral language. There is very little printed written material in this language that was not written by missionaries or linguists. The first published material written fully in Lun Bawang is a translation of the Bible from 1982, which is called . A Lun Bawang–English dictionary was constructed in 1969 by the University of Washington. A dialect of the Lun Bawang language, Kemaloh Lundayeh, was compiled in 2006 into a bilingual dictionary of Lundayeh and English.

Phonology
There are 6 vowels, 19 consonants and 5 diphthongs in the Lun Bawang language.

According to Blust (2006), Lun Dayeh has a series of mixed-voiced stops, similar to those of Kelabit, but does not have a simple .

Example

Lord's Prayer (Our Father)

Translation:
Our Father, who art in heaven, hallowed be thy name. Thy kingdom come, Thy will be done on earth as it is in heaven. Give us this day our daily bread, and forgive us our sins, as we forgive those who sin against us. Do not lead us into temptation, but deliver us from evil. Amen. For the kingdom, the power, and the glory, are Yours now and forever. Amen. (Matthew 6:9–13)

References

Bibliography 

 
 Clayre, Beatrice (1972). "A preliminary comparative study of the Lun Bawang (Murut) and Sa’ban languages of Sarawak". Sarawak Museum Journal 20: 40-41, 45-47.
 Clayre, Beatrice (2014). "A preliminary typology of the languages of Middle Borneo." In Advances in research on cultural and linguistic practices in Borneo, edited by Peter Sercombe, Michael Boutin and Adrian Clynes, 123–151. Phillips, Maine USA: Borneo Research Council.
 
 Crain, JB (1982). "A Lun Dayeh Engagement Negotiation in Studies of Ethnic Minority Peoples." Contributions to Southeast Asian Ethnography Singapour (1):142-178.
 Deegan, James (1970). "Some Lun Bawang Spirit Chants." The Sarawak Museum Journal 18 (36–37):264–280. 
 Deegan, James, and Robin Usad (1972). "Upai Kasan: A Lun Bawang Folktale". Sarawak Museum Journal 20:107–144.
 Ganang, Ricky, Jay Bouton Crain, and Vicki Pearson-Rounds (2008). Kemaloh Lundayeh-English Dictionary: And, Bibliographic List of Materials Relating to the Lundayeh-Lun Bawang-Kelabit and Related Groups of Sarawak, Sabah, Brunei and East Kalimantan. Vol. 1: Borneo Research Council.
 Garman, M. A., Griffiths, P. D., & Wales, R. J. (1970). Murut (Lun Buwang) prepositions and noun particles in children's speech. Sarawak Museum Journal, 18, 353–376.
 Lees, Shirley. 1959. "Lun Daye Phonemics". Sarawak Museum Journal 9/13-14: 56–62
 
 Omar, A. H. (1983). The Malay peoples of Malaysia and their languages. Dewan Bahasa dan Pustaka, Kementerian Pelajaran Malaysia.
 Southwell, C. Hudson (1949). ‘The Structure of the Murut Language’. Sarawak Museum Journal 5: 104–115.

Apo Duat languages
Languages of Indonesia
Languages of Malaysia
Sarawak
Languages of Sabah